The Dolgoch Falls (also known as the Dol-goch falls, or the Dol-gôch falls) are a series of three waterfalls near Tywyn in Gwynedd, North Wales. The falls are part of the Nant Dol-gôch stream, which flows into the Afon Fathew, and form a popular walk from the nearby Dolgoch station on the Talyllyn Railway.

References

External links
www.geograph.co.uk : photos of Dolgoch Falls and surrounding area

Bryncrug
Waterfalls of Gwynedd
Waterfalls of Snowdonia
Dolgoch